Goff House, Goff Farm, or Goff Barn may refer to:

Solomon Goffe House, Meriden, Connecticut
Hugh and Susie Goff House, Jerome, Idaho
Strauder Goff House, Winchester, Kentucky, listed on the National Register of Historic Places (NRHP)
Goff-Baskett House, Brandenburg, Kentucky, listed on the NRHP
Goff Farm, Rehoboth, Massachusetts
Goff Homestead, Rehoboth, Massachusetts
Goff House (Hamilton, Montana)
William I. and Magdalen M. Goff House, El Reno, Oklahoma
Pitcher-Goff House, Pawtucket, Rhode Island
J. Whitney Goff Round Barn, Winfred, South Dakota
Stealey-Goff-Vance House, Clarksburg, West Virginia